The Three Tuns is a pub on Coppergate, in the city centre of York, in England.

The building was probably constructed in the 16th century and is timber-framed, with the first floor jettied.  It was heavily altered in the 19th century, since when it has been a two-storey building with an attic, and the windows date from this period.  At the north-east end, there is a lean-to bay, and there is a large 20th-century extension to the rear.  The rear extension includes an eight-foot stone wall, which may be Mediaeval.

The building is recorded as having been a pub from at least 1782.  It was owned by Maltby & Wilberforce from 1861 and specialised in selling wines and spirits.  It later became owned by the Courage Brewery and was sold to the Mansfield Brewery in 1991.  In 1970, a cache of silver coins was discovered, and a cache of gold coins was also discovered during renovations on the customer service area.
The building was Grade II listed in 1954.

References

Grade II listed pubs in York
Timber framed buildings in Yorkshire
Timber framed pubs in England
Coppergate